The literature of al-Andalus, also known as Andalusi literature, was produced in al-Andalus, or Islamic Iberia, from the Muslim conquest in 711 to either the Catholic conquest of Granada in 1492 or the expulsion of the Moors ending in 1614. Andalusi literature was written primarily in Arabic, but also in Hebrew, Latin, and Romance.

Abdellah Hilaat's World Literature Encyclopedia divides the history of al-Andalus into two periods: the period of expansion, starting with the conquest of Hispania up to the first Taifa period, and the period of recession in which al-Andalus was ruled by two major African empires: the Almoravid and the Almohad.

Conquest 

Arabic literature in al-Andalus began with the Umayyad conquest of Hispania starting in the year 711. The 20th century Moroccan scholar of literature Abdellah Guennoun cites the Friday sermon of the Amazigh general Tariq ibn Ziyad to his soldiers upon landing in Iberia as a first example.

The literature of the Muslim conquerors of Iberia, aside from the Quran, was limited to eastern strophic poetry that was popular in the early 7th century. The content of the conquerors' poetry was often boasting about noble heritage, celebrating courage in war, expressing nostalgia for homeland, or elegy for those lost in battle, though all that remains from this period is mentions and descriptions.

In contrast with the circumstances in the Visigothic invasion of Iberia, the Arabic that came with the Muslim invasion had the status of "a vehicle for a higher culture, a literate and literary civilization." From the eighth to the thirteenth century, the non-Latin forms of intellectual expression were dominant in the area.

Umayyad period (756–1031) 
In his History of Arabic Literature, Hanna Al-Fakhoury cites two main factors as shaping Andalusi society in the early Umayyad period: the mixing of the Arabs with other peoples and the desire to replicate the Mashriq. The bustling economy of al-Andalus allowed al-Hakam I to invest in education and literacy; he built 27 madrasas in Cordoba and sent missions to the east to procure books to be brought back to his library. al-Fakhoury cites Reinhart Dozy in his 1881 : "Almost all of Muslim Spain could read and write, while the upper class of Christian Europe could not, with the exception of the clergy." Cities—such as Córdoba, Seville, Granada, and Toledo—were the most important centers of knowledge in al-Andalus.

On religion 
The east was determined to spread Islam and protect it in distant Iberia, sending religious scholars, or ulamaa. Religious study grew and spread, and the Iberian Umayyads, for political reasons, adopted the Maliki school of jurisprudence, named after the Imam Malik ibn Anas and promoted by Abd al-Rahman al-Awza'i. A religious school was established, which published Malik's Muwatta.

This school produced a number of notable scholars, prominent among whom was Ibn 'Abd al-Barr. Al-Andalus witnessed great deliberation in Quranic exegesis, or tafsir, from competing schools of jurisprudence, or fiqh. Upon his return from the east,  (817-889) unsuccessfully attempted to introduce the Shafi‘i school of fiqh, though Ibn Hazm (994-1064) considered Makhlad's exegesis favorable to Tafsir al-Tabari. The Zahiri school was, however, introduced by Ibn Qasim al-Qaysi, and further supported by Mundhir ibn Sa'īd al-Ballūṭī. It was also heralded by Ibn Hazm, a polymath at the forefront of all kinds of literary production in the 11th century, widely acknowledged as the father of comparative religious studies, and who wrote  (The Separator Concerning Religions, Heresies, and Sects).

The Muʿtazila school and philosophy also developed in al-Andalus, as attested to in the book of Ibn Mura (931).

On language 
The study of language spread and was invigorated by the migration of the linguist  (967), who migrated from Baghdad to Cordoba and wrote a two-volume work entitled  based on his teachings at the Mosque of Córdoba. He also authored a 5000-page compendium on language  and an-Nawādir.

On history 
At first, Andalusi writers mixed history with legend, as  did. The so-called "Syrian chronicle", a history of events in the latter half of the 8th century, probably written around 800, is the earliest Arabic history of al-Andalus. It is known today, however, only as the larger part of the 11th-century Akhbār majmūʿa. The author of the Syrian chronicle is unknown, but may have been Abu Ghalib Tammam ibn Alkama, who came to al-Andalus with the Syrian army in 741. Tammam's descendant, Tammam ibn Alkama al-Wazir (d. 896), wrote poetry, including a lost urjūza on the history of al-Andalus.

Most historians were interested in the history of Hispania, tracing the chronology of its history by kings and princes. Encyclopedias of people also became popular, such as encyclopedias of judges, doctors, and writers. The most important historical work of this period was Said al-Andalusi's Tabaqat ul-Umam, which chronicled the history of the Greeks and the Romans as well.

On geography 
Among the prominent writers in geography—besides Aḥmad ibn Muḥammad ibn Mūsa al-Rāzī, who described al-Andalus with great skill—there was Abū ʿUbayd al-Bakri (1094).

On math and astronomy 

Writing in math and astronomy flourished in this period with the influence of Maslama al-Majriti (1007), who developed the work of Ptolemy and al-Khwarizmi. Ibn al-Saffar wrote about the astrolabe and influenced European science into the 15th century. Ibn al-Samh was a mathematician who also wrote about astrolabes.

On medicine and agriculture 
Works in medicine and agriculture also flourished under Abd al-Rahman III. Among writers in these topics there were al-Zahrawi (1013).

Ibn al-Kattani, also known as al-Mutatabbib, wrote about medicine, philosophy, and logic.

Literary works 
The collection Al-ʿIqd al-Farīd by Ibn Abd Rabbih (940) could be considered the first Andalusi literary work, though its contents relate to the Mashriq.

Muhammad ibn Hani al-Andalusi al-Azdi, a North African poet, studied in al-Andalus.

The poet al-Ghazal of Jaén served as a diplomat in 840 and 845. His poetry is quoted extensively by Ibn Dihya.

Muwashshah 

From around the 9th century, the Arab and Hispanic elements of al-Andalus began to coalesce, giving birth to a new Arab literature, evident in the new poetic form: the muwashshah.

In the beginning, muwashshah represented a variety of poetic meters and schemes, ending with a verse in Ibero-Romance. It marked the first instance of language mixing in Arab poetry as well as the syncretism of Arab and Hispanic cultures. The muwashshah remained sung in Standard Arabic although its scheme and meter changed and the Ibero-Romance ending was added. Some famous examples include "Lamma Bada Yatathanna" and "". In spite of its widespread popularity and its favorability among Mashreqi critics, the muwashshah remained a form inferior to classical Arabic forms that varied only minimally in the courts of the Islamic west, due to the folksy nature of the muwashshah.

The muwashshah would typically end with a closing stanza, or a kharja, in a Romance language or Arabic vernacular—except in praise poems, in which the closing stanza would also be in Standard Arabic.

The muwashshah has gained importance recently among Orientalists because of its possible connection to early Spanish and European folk poetry and the troubadour tradition.

Eastern influence 
Andalusi literature was heavily influenced by Eastern styles, with court literature often replicating eastern forms. Under Abd al-Rahman II, came Ziryab (857)—the mythic poet, artist, musician and teacher—from the Abbasid Empire in the East. He gave Andalusi society Baghdadi influence.

The qiyān were a social class of non-free women trained as entertainers. The qiyān brought from the Abbasid East were conduits of art, literature, and culture.

The court poets of Cordoba followed his footsteps in varying and mastering their craft. The maqama known as Al-Maqama al-Qurtubiya, attributed to al-Fath ibn Khaqan, is notable as it is a poem of invective satirizing . According to Jaakko Hämeen-Anttila, the use of the maqama form for invective appears to be an Andalusi innovation.

Court poetry followed tradition until the 11th century, when it took a bold new form: the Umayyad caliphs sponsored literature and worked to gather texts, as evidenced in the library of al-Hakam II.

 led a movement of poets of the aristocracy opposed to the folksy muwashshah and fanatical about eloquent poetry and orthodox Classical Arabic. He outlined his ideas in his book at-Tawabi' waz-Zawabi''', a fictional story about a journey through the world of the Jinn.

 Judeo-Andalusi literature 

Jewish writers in al-Andalus were sponsored by courtiers such as Hasdai ibn Shaprut (905-975) Samuel ibn Naghrillah (993-1056). Jonah ibn Janah (990-1055) wrote a book of Hebrew.

Samuel ibn Naghrillah, Joseph ibn Naghrela, and Ibn Sahl al-Isra'ili wrote poetry in Arabic, but most Jewish writers in al-Andalus—while incorporating elements such as rhyme, meter, and themes of classical Arabic poetry—created poetry in Hebrew. In addition to a highly regarded corpus of religious poetry, poets such as Dunash ben Labrat, Moses ibn Ezra, and Solomon ibn Gabirol wrote about praise poetry about their Jewish patrons, as well and on topics traditionally considered non-Jewish, such as "carousing, nature, and love" as well as poems with "homoerotic themes.Qasmuna Bint Ismā'īl was mentioned in Ahmed Mohammed al-Maqqari's  as well as al-Suyuti's 15th century anthology of female poets.

Bahya ibn Paquda wrote Duties of the Heart in Judeo-Arabic in Hebrew script around 1080, and Judah ha-Levi wrote the Book of Refutation and Proof on Behalf of the Despised Religion in Arabic around 1140.Petrus Alphonsi was an Andalusi Jew who converted to Christianity under Alfonso I of Aragon in the year 1106. He wrote Dialogi contra Iudaeos, an imaginary conversation between a Christian and a Jew, and Disciplina Clericalis, a collection of Eastern sayings and fables in a frame-tale format present in Arabic literature such as Kalīla wa-Dimna. He also translated al-Khawarizmi's tables and advocated for Arabic sciences, serving as a bridge between cultures at a time when Christian Europe was opening up to "Arabic philosophical, scientific, medical, astronomical, and literary cultures."

Maimonides (1135-1204), who fled al-Andalus in the Almohad period, addressed his Guide for the Perplexed to Joseph ben Judah of Ceuta.

Joseph ben Judah ibn Aknin (c. 1150 – c. 1220) was polymath and prolific writer born in Barcelona and moved to North Africa under the Almohads, settling in Fes.Piyyut was a form of poetry in Hebrew performed musically with Arabic scales and meters.

 Mozarabic literature 

The literature of the Mozarabs is bilingual in Latin and Arabic. Mozarabs were originally those Christians living under Islamic rule  following their own Mozarabic rite. Many continued to live under Christian rule while keeping their distinctive rite down to the 14th century. The switch from a predominantly Latinate culture to an Arabic one was already well underway in the mid-9th century. The use of Arabic by Mozarabs rapidly declined in the late 13th century.

Among the Latin works of early Mozarabic culture, historiography is especially important, since it constitutes the earliest record from al-Andalus of the conquest period. There are two main works, the Chronicle of 741 and the Chronicle of 754.

At the height of the Córdoban martyrs' movement (850–859), Albarus of Córdoba wrote a treatise in Latin, Indiculus luminosus, defending the martyrs and decrying the movement towards Arabic among his fellow Mozarabs. A generation later, Ḥafṣ ibn Albar al-Qūtī, finished a rhymed verse translation of the Psalms from the Latin Vulgate in 889. Although it survives in only one manuscript, it was a popular text and is quoted by Muslim and Jewish authors. Ḥafṣ also wrote a book of Christian answers to Muslim questions about their faith called The Book of the Fifty-Seven Questions. It is lost, but there are excerpts in the work of al-Qurṭubī, who praises Ḥafṣ' command of Arabic as the best among the Mozarabs. The 11th-century writer Ibn Gabirol also quotes from a lost work of Ḥafṣ al-Qūtī.

 First Taifa period (1031–1086) 

The collapse of the caliphate and the beginning of the Taifa period, did not have a negative impact on poetic production. In fact, poetry in al-Andalus reached its apex at this time.

Abu al-Hakam al-Kirmani was a doctor, mathematician, and philosopher from Cordoba; he is also credited with first bringing Brethren of Purity to al-Andalus.

Al-Mu'tamid ibn Abbad, poet king of the Abbadid Taifa of Seville, was known as a generous sponsor of the arts. Ibn Hamdis of Sicily joined al-Mu'tamid's court.

 Almoravid period (1086–1150) 
Literature flourished in the Almoravid period. The political unification of Morocco and al-Andalus under the Almoravid dynasty rapidly accelerated the cultural interchange between the two continents, beginning when Yusuf Bin Tashfiin sent al-Mu'tamid ibn  Abbad into exile in Tangier and ultimately Aghmat.

In the Almoravid period two writers stand out: the religious scholar and judge Ayyad ben Moussa and the polymath Ibn Bajja (Avempace). Ayyad is known for having authored Kitāb al-Shifāʾ bīTaʾrif Ḥuqūq al-Muṣṭafá.

Scholars and theologians such as Ibn Barrajan were summoned to the Almoravid capital in Marrakesh where they underwent tests.

 Poetry 
Ibn Zaydun, al-Mu'tamid, and Muhammad ibn Ammar were among the more innovative poets of al-Andalus, breaking away from traditional Eastern styles.

The muwashshah was an important form of poetry and music in the Almoravid period.

In the Almoravid period, in which the fragmented taifas were united, poetry faded as they were mostly interested in religion. Only in Valencia could free poetry of the sort that spread in the Taifa period be found, while the rulers in other areas imposed traditional praise poetry on their subjects. In Valencia, there was poetry of nature and ghazal by Ibn Khafaja and poetry of nature and wine by Ibn az-Zaqqaq.

 History 
The historians Ibn Alqama, Ibn Hayyan, al-Bakri, Ibn Bassam, and al-Fath ibn Khaqan all lived in the Almoravid period.

 Almohad period (1150–1230) 
The Almohads worked to suppress the influence of Maliki fiqh—even publicly burning copies of Muwatta Imam Malik and Maliki commentaries. They sought to disseminate the doctrine of Ibn Tumart, author of E'az Ma Yutlab ( The Most Noble Calling), Muhadhi al-Muwatta' ( Counterpart of the Muwatta), and Talkhis Sahih Muslim ( Compendium of Sahih Muslim).

 Almohad reforms 

Literary production continued despite the devastating effect the Almohad reforms had on cultural life in their domain. Almohad universities continued the knowledge of preceding Andalusi scholars as well as ancient Greco-Roman writers; contemporary literary figures included Ibn Rushd (Averroes), Hafsa bint al-Hajj al-Rukuniyya, Ibn Tufail, Ibn Zuhr, Ibn al-Abbar, Ibn Amira and many more poets, philosophers, and scholars. The abolishment of the dhimmi status further stifled the once flourishing Jewish Andalusi cultural scene; Maimonides went east and many Jews moved to Castillian-controlled Toledo.

Ibn Tufail and Ibn Rushd (Averroes) were considered the main philosophers of the Almohad Caliphate and were patronized by the court. Ibn Tufail wrote the philosophical novel Hayy ibn Yaqdhan, which would later influence Robinson Crusoe. Ibn Rushd wrote his landmark work The Incoherence of the Incoherence responding directly to al-Ghazali's work The Incoherence of the Philosophers.

 Sufism 
With the continents united under empire, the development and institutionalization of Sufism was a bi-continental phenomenon taking place on both sides of the Strait of Gibraltar. Abu Madyan, described as "the most influential figure of the developmental period of North African Sufism," lived in the Almohad period. Ibn Arabi, venerated by many Sufis as ash-Sheikh al-Akbar, was born in Murcia and studied in Seville. His works, such as the Meccan Revelations, were highly influential. Ibn Saʿāda, also a native of Murcia, was an influential traditionist who studied in the East. He wrote a Sufi treatise, Tree of the Imagination by Which One Ascends to the Path of Intellection, in Murcia.

When literary figures sensed the decline of Andalusi poetry, they began to gather and anthologize: Ibn Bassam wrote , al-Fath ibn Khaqan wrote " Qalā'id al-'Iqyān", Ibn Sa'id al-Maghribi wrote Al-Mughrib fī ḥulā l-Maghrib and Rayat al-mubarrizin wa-ghayat al-mumayyazin. Up until the departure of the Muslims from al-Andalus, there were those who carried the standard of the muwashshah, such as al-Tutili (1126) and Ibn Baqi (1145), as well as those such as Ibn Quzman (1159) who elevated zajal to the highest of artistic heights. The zajal form experienced a rebirth thanks to Ibn Quzman.

Ibn Sab'in was a Sufi scholar from Ricote who wrote the Sicilian Questions in response to the inquiries of Frederick II of Sicily.

 Female poets 
Hamda bint Ziyad al-Muaddib was a 12th-century poet from Guadix known as the "al-Khansa of al-Andalus." Hafsa bint al-Hajj al-Rukuniyya was a poet from Granada. She later worked for the Almohad caliph Abu Yusuf Yaqub al-Mansur, educating members of his family.

 Biography 
Biographical books spread after Qadi Ayyad, and among the famous biographers there were Ibn Bashkuwāl, Abu Ja'far Ahmad ibn Yahya al-Dabbi, Ibn al-Abbar, and Ibn Zubayr al-Gharnati. Ṣafwān ibn Idrīs (d. 1202) of Murcia wrote a biographical dictionary of recent poets, Zād al-musāfir wa-ghurrat muḥayyā ʾl-adab al-sāfir.

The prophetic biography Kitab al-anwar (or Libro de las luces) of Abu al-Hasan Bakri—or else the work on which his final redaction was based—was in circulation in al-Andalus in the 12th century, when a translation into Latin was made for the Corpus Cluniacense. Sometime between the 11th and 13th centuries, the work was also translated into Andalusi Romance, presumably in the Christian North. Several aljamiado manuscripts are known, that is, Romance copies written in Arabic script. The earliest is from 1295.

 On history 
Ibn Sa'id al-Maghribi wrote Al-Mughrib fī ḥulā l-Maghrib citing much of what was published in the field beforehand.

 On geography and travel writing 
Muhammad al-Idrisi stood out in geography and in travel writing: , Ibn Jubayr, and Mohammed al-Abdari al-Hihi.

 Poetry 
Abu Ishaq Ibrahim al-Kanemi, an Afro-Arab poet from Kanem, was active in Seville writing panegyric qasidas for Caliph Yaqub al-Mansur. Although he spent more time in Morocco, it was his stay in Seville that has preserved his name, since he was included in the Andalusi biographical dictionaries.

 Third Taifa period 

In the 12th and 13th centuries, the sciences—such as mathematics, astronomy, pharmacology, botany, and medicine—flourished.

Abu al-Baqa ar-Rundi wrote the qasida Elegy for al-Andalus in 1267.

Hadith Bayad wa Riyad is a 13th-century love story and one of 3 surviving illuminated manuscripts from al-Andalus.

Arabic influenced Spanish and permeated its vernacular forms. New dialects formed with their own folk literature that is studied for its effects on European poetry in the Middle Ages, and for its role in Renaissance poetry. Ramon Llull drew extensively from Arabic sciences, and first wrote his apologetic Book of the Gentile and the Three Wise Men in Arabic before Catalan and Latin.

The agriculturalist Ibn al-'Awwam, active in Seville in the late 12th century, wrote , considered the most comprehensive medieval book in Arabic on agriculture. Ibn Khaldun considered it a revision of Ibn Wahshiyya's Nabataean Agriculture.

 Nasrid period (1238–1492) 

According to Salah Jarrar, the "bulk of [literature in the Nasrid period] dealt and was closely involved with the political life of the state. The conflict between the last Muslim state in Spain and the Spanish states seems to have dominated every aspect of life in Granada."

The polymath and statesman Lisān ad-Dīn Ibn al-Khatīb is regarded as one of the most significant writers of the Nasrid period, covering subject such as "history, biography, the art of government, politics, geography, poetics, theology, fiqh, Sufism, grammar, medicine, veterinary medicine, agriculture, music, and falconry." The last of the poets of al-Andalus before the fall of Granada was Ibn Zamrak.

As for prose, which began in al-Andalus with Ibn Shahid and Ibn Hazm, it quickly leaned toward replicating the prose of the Mashreq. Siraj al-Muluk by Abu Bakr al-Turtushi, as well as the al-Balawi Encyclopedia and the list of maqamat that replicated those of al-Hariri of Basra, such as those of Ahmed bin Abd el-Mu'min of Jerez (1222). The Almohads encouraged religious and scientific composition: in the religious sciences,  (1426) wrote at-Tuhfa and  wrote about language. The works of some writers, such as the grammarian Ibn Malik and Abu Hayyan al-Gharnati, reached the Mashreq and had an influence there.

 Andalusi literature after Catholic conquest 

 Suppression 
After the Fall of Granada, Cardinal Francisco Jiménez de Cisneros oversaw the forced mass conversion of the population in the Spanish Inquisition and the burning of Andalusi manuscripts in Granada. In 1526, Charles V (Charles I of Spain)—issued an edict against "heresy" (e.g. Muslim practices by "New Christians"), including the use of Arabic. The Moriscos managed to get this suspended for forty years by the payment of a large sum (80,000 ducados). King Philip II of Spain's Pragmatica of 1 January 1567 finally banned the use of Arabic throughout Spain, leading directly to the Rebellion of the Alpujarras (1568–71).

 Resistance 
After Catholic conquest, Muslims in Castile, Aragon and Catalonia often used Castilian, Aragonese and Catalan dialects instead of the Andalusi Arabic dialect. Mudéjar texts were then written in Castilian and Aragonese, but in Arabic script. One example is the anonymous Poema de Yuçuf'', written in Aragonese but with Aljamiado Arabic script. Most of this literature consisted of religious essays, poems, and epic, imaginary narratives. Often, popular texts were translated into this Castilian-Arabic hybrid.

Even after Muslims were forced to convert to Catholicism in 1502 in Castile and 1526 in Aragon, Moriscos continued to produce and read religious texts—notably the Morisco Quran.

Much of the literature of the Moriscos focused on affirming the place of Arabic-speaking Spaniards in Spanish history and that their culture was integral to Spain.

References 

Arabic literature
European literature
Islamic literature
Jewish literature
Medieval literature